Basilica of the Visitation of the Blessed Virgin Mary is the name of several churches:

Basilica of the Visitation of the Blessed Virgin Mary, Levoča, Slovakia
Basilica of the Visitation of the Blessed Virgin Mary, Staré Hory, Slovakia